The 1970 South Australian state election was held on 30 May 1970.

Retiring Members

Labor

 Tom Casey, MHA (Frome)
 Cyril Hutchens, MHA (Hindmarsh)
 Lindsay Riches, MHA (Stuart)
 Ron Loveday, MHA (Whyalla)

Liberal and Country

 Berthold Teusner, MHA (Angas)
 Ernie Edwards, MHA (Eyre)
 Glen Pearson, MHA (Flinders)
 Bryant Giles, MHA (Gumeracha)
 John Freebairn, MHA (Light)

Independent

 Tom Stott, MHA (Ridley)

House of Assembly
Sitting members are shown in bold text. Successful candidates are highlighted in the relevant colour. Where there is possible confusion, an asterisk (*) is also used.

References

Candidates for South Australian state elections
1970 elections in Australia
1970s in South Australia